Panikos Pounnas (born August 14, 1969) is a Cypriot former international football midfielder.

He started and ended his career in Anorthosis Famagusta, playing solely for the Famagusta side.

External links
 

1969 births
Living people
Cypriot footballers
Cyprus international footballers
Anorthosis Famagusta F.C. players
Association football midfielders
People from Famagusta